The Mercier criterion is a criterion for plasma used in the theoretical study of plasma instability. It was first proposed in 1954 by C. Mercier, who applied the perturbation method (in which  represents the frequency

References

Plasma instabilities